Maximum entropy may refer to: 

 Entropy, a scientific concept as well as a measurable physical property that is most commonly associated with a state of disorder, randomness, or uncertainty.

Physics
 Maximum entropy thermodynamics
 Maximum entropy spectral estimation

Mathematics and statistics
 Principle of maximum entropy
 Maximum entropy probability distribution
 Maximum entropy classifier, in regression analysis

See also
 Second law of thermodynamics, establishes the concept of entropy as a physical property of a thermodynamic system